The Assiut Barrage is a dam on the Nile River in the city of Assiut in Upper Egypt (250 miles to the south of Cairo). It was completed in 1903.

Background
It was designed by the famous British engineer Sir William Willcocks who also concurrently designed and built the Aswan Low Dam, the first Nile reservoir, about  up-stream. The Assiut dam was constructed between 1898 and 1903, and in conjunction with the reservoir, provided for the diversion of river water into Egypt's largest irrigation canal, the Ibrahimiya Canal, during the low water season. The dam was estimated to cost £525,000 but by the time of its completion it actually cost £870,000. The main contractor for the project was the British contractor John Aird & Co. The project's massive size involved 2,400,000 cubic yards of earthwork, 125,000 cubic yards of concrete, 85,000 cubic yards of masonry, 125,000 cubic yards of pitching and more than 4,000 tons of cast iron pipes.

There are 111 arched openings of  span in the masonry dam. This platform is protected on its up-stream and down-stream sides by a continuous and impermeable line of cast iron tongued and grooved sheet-piling with cemented joints.

It is constructed of granite, the foundation platform mentioned above being of concrete.

The Ibrahimiya head regulator structure, which was built at the same time when the Assiut Barrage was being constructed, was of similar design to the barrage except having only nine 5 m wide sluices, and a 9 m wide lock.

Assiut Barrages Repairs and Upgrades
Between 1934 and 1938 the Egyptian Government carried out extensive remodeling works at the barrage and the Ibrahimiya head regulator, principally extending the piers, grouting, extending the approach slabs and updating the hydro-mechanical equipment. In 1956 works were carried out at the Ibrahimiya head regulator as a result of significant scour holes that developed downstream of the structure. Extensions to downstream concrete apron were completed as well as lengthening of the southern lock wall. Some further grouting works and replacement of the lock gates took place in the 1970s. In 1979 a reinforced concrete pedestrian footbridge was constructed on the downstream side of the head regulator. Between 1984 and 1986 a program of cement grouting works was undertaken at the barrage, though there are no records of the head regulator receiving similar treatment. After more than 100 years in service, the civil works have been affected by age and also by tailwater erosion as a consequence of a modified river regime after the construction of the Aswan High Dam.

The Planned New Dam
Along with the Aswan Low Dam, the Assiut Dam today remains in service as the oldest dam on the Nile in Upper Egypt. The two other old dams (Naga Hamadi and Isna Barrages) were replaced with new dams in the 1990s. Between 2000 and 2005, the Egyptian government commissioned an extended Feasibility Study (FS) financed by the German government to investigate the options of rehabilitation of the existing Assiut Barrage and the Ibrahimiya head regulator against reconstruction of a new barrage with a hydro-power plant. German Consultants financed by the Kreditanstalt für Wiederaufbau (KfW) conducted the study and concluded that a new dam with power generating capabilities would be the most economic option. This new dam would provide an increase in the allowed head, allowing more water discharges into the Ibrahimiya Canal and will improve navigation conditions. The new dam will also include a low head hydropower plant providing about 40 Megawatts.

The decision taken upon the results of the feasibility study was to proceed with the project of constructing a new barrage 200-300m downstream of the existing barrage. The proposed dam components are: 
Sluiceway: 8 radial gates, 17m wide
Hydropower plant: 4 turbines x 8MW
Additional navigation lock: 120 x 17m chamber
Closure dam: embankment type, 11m high
Rehabilitation of the existing navigation lock; and
Rehabilitation of the existing Ibrahimiya head regulator

There is a concern that the new maximum pool level will increase the groundwater levels in Assiut city and in some areas in the upstream. Dealing with this situation, different layouts of the project have been studied in the feasibility study and some mitigation measures have been suggested.

References

Dams in Egypt
Dams on the Nile
Barrages (dam)
Dams completed in 1903
Masonry dams
1903 establishments in Egypt